Ferei–CCN is a Belarusian women's road bicycle racing team, established in 2021, which participates in elite women's races.

After the 2022 Russian invasion of Ukraine, the UCI said that Belarusian teams are forbidden from competing in international events.

National champions
2021
 Belarus Track (Scratch race), Ina Savenka
 Belarus Track (Elimination race), Aksana Salauyeva

References

External links

UCI Women's Teams
Cycling teams based in Belarus
Cycling teams established in 2021